State Highway 254 (SH 254) is a short state highway completely within Palo Pinto County, Texas. The route was originally designated on September 21, 1937 on a route between Graham and Mineral Wells. By 1945, the route had been built, passing through Graford and ending on US 281 north of Mineral Wells. The highway continues as FM 1885 southeast to FM 920 near Weatherford. On January 31, 1969, it was shortened to its current route when SH 16 was extended north through Graham.

Junction list

References

254
Transportation in Palo Pinto County, Texas